Walid Jarmouni (born 20 May 2000) is a French professional footballer who plays as a forward for  club Paris 13 Atletico on loan from Pau.

Professional career
On 26 June 2020, Jarmouni signed his first professional contract with Sochaux. Jarmouni made his professional debut with Sochaux in a 2-1 Ligue 2 win over Troyes AC on 29 August 2020.

On 18 June 2021, he joined Sète on loan.

In June 2022, Jarmouni signed with Pau.

On 29 January 2023, Jarmouni was loaned by Paris 13 Atletico.

Personal life
Born in France, Jarmouni is of Moroccan descent.

References

External links
 
 Ligue 2 Profile

2000 births
Living people
Footballers from Montpellier
French footballers
French sportspeople of Moroccan descent
Association football forwards
FC Sochaux-Montbéliard players
FC Sète 34 players
Pau FC players
Paris 13 Atletico players
Ligue 2 players
Championnat National players
Championnat National 3 players